Vernonia bontocensis is a species of perennial plant in the family Asteraceae. It is endemic to the Philippines.

References 

bontocensis
Flora of the Philippines